In mathematics, a hypertoric variety or toric hyperkähler variety is a quaternionic analog of a toric variety constructed by applying the hyper-Kähler quotient construction of  to a torus acting on a quaternionic vector space.  gave a systematic description of hypertoric varieties.

References

 

Algebraic geometry